Historic Films Archive is a stock footage library  operating from New York. It owns the rights to an extensive collection of television and film footage dating back to 1895. Its library includes all genres of American Music on film  and video and historic archive footage derived from American Newsreels, Feature Films, Industrial shorts, home movies, out-takes and cartoons.

History 

The company originated as a Manhattan based research archive named Associated Researchers and Image Quest; it was founded by Joe Lauro and Richard Plagge in 1991. Lauro had previously worked for Archive Films as a researcher and Plagge for FOX MOVIETONE NEWS when they decided to form their own company. They soon realized that licensing footage was more lucrative than acting as researchers.

In 1993, the company moved to East Hampton, close to Plagge's home.

In 1994 Plagge died, and Lauro formed a partnership with California producer Andrew Solt, the owner of the rights to The Ed Sullivan Show. They converted ARIQ into the Historic Film Archive in 1997.

The Historic Films library is fully digitized and its material is viewable for research purposes on its official website.

Collection 
The Ed Sullivan Show
The Steve Allen Show (1955–60)
Beat Club/Musikladen
Center For Southern Folklore
Classic Comedy Library
Classic TV Commercial Collection
Dance Party USA/Dancin' On Air
Danish Broadcasting (DR) Archive
D.A. Pennebaker Collection
Disco Magic/Disco '77
Folklife Productions Library
The Red Skelton Show (1951–71)
Metropolis Video–live from CBGBs
Music Video Collection
The Ernest Tubb Show
The Hollywood Out-Take Library (1930s-50s)
Live From The Bitter End
Screenocean (Channels 3 & 4 UK)
Midsummer's Rock Festival
Murray "The K" Archive
Pathe News, Inc.
Glen Campbell Show (1969–73)
Rollin On The River
Rainbow Quest (1965–66)
Rhythm & Blues Awards Shows/Ebony Affair
Sam Lay Blues Collection
Storyville Jazz Collection
WTTW's Sound Stage (1974-1983)
Southern Telenews Library (1958–1978)
Studio 54 Collection
Rockpalast (German live concert series 1970s-2000s)
The Beat (1965–67)
The Dallas Pop Festival (1969)
The David Susskind Show
The Hagermann Beatles Collection
The Hy Lit Show
The Jam Handy Collection/American Industrial Fins 1915-85
The Jerry Lewis Show (1964–70)
The Last Of The Wild (Nature Series)
Film & Video Stock Shots Library
Don Kirshner's Rock Concert/In Concert
The Woodstock Collection
Tribute Grand Ole Opry Stars of the 1950s
Isle Of Wight Festival 1970
United News Collection (1942–44)
Universal Newsreels (1929–67)
Vidicom  Fashion Film Collection (1980s and 1990s)
Newport Folk Festival (1963–69)
M&T News Service (1985-2003)
Black Journal (on behalf of WNET)
Little Walter Home Movies
Steel Pier Show (1970s-80s)
cd:uk (British Music program 1990s-2007)
CD:USA (2007)
MTV MUSIC NEWS SEGMENTS/Azar Collection (1981–85)

References

Film archives in the United States
Television archives in the United States
Companies based in New York City